Keld (or Keilde) is a hamlet in the English county of Cumbria.  It lies within the civil parish of Shap.

On the banks of the River Lowther it is a mile southwest of Shap and falls within that village's civil parish, Shap Abbey is nearby. Keld's medieval chapel (right) is noted for its unusual simplicity.

See also

Listed buildings in Shap

External links 

Video footage and history of Keld Chapel

Hamlets in Cumbria
Shap